The Official Units of the National Park System of the United States is the collection of physical properties owned or administered by the National Park Service.

As of December 2022, there are  official units of the National Park System; however, this number can be misleading. For example, Denali National Park and Preserve are counted as two units, since the same name applies to a national park and an adjacent national preserve. Yet Jean Lafitte National Historical Park and Preserve is counted as one unit, despite its double designation. Counting methodology is rooted in the language of a park's enabling legislation. Furthermore, the NPS contributes resources to "affiliated areas" which do not fall under its administration, and these do not count toward the official list number. An example is Oklahoma City National Memorial.

These units are a subset of the areas in the United States National Park System, and nearly all participate in the national park passport stamps program.  National Park System units are found in all 50 states, in the District of Columbia, and in the U.S. territories of Guam, American Samoa, the U.S. Virgin Islands, and Puerto Rico. (The territory of the Northern Mariana Islands has an affiliated area but not an official NPS unit.)

Bold indicates national parks.

See also 
 List of areas in the United States National Park System
 List of fee areas in the United States National Park System
 List of all national parks of the world
 List of U.S. state parks
National Park Passport Stamps
 National Park Travelers Club

References
The National Parks: Index 2012-2016 - Official Index of the National Park Service
National Park Service Index:Addendum (2016-2017) - Official Index updated June 2017

External links 

 National Park Service
 National Park System Units by type
 Former National Park System Units: An Analysis
 The 417 NPS units, by classification. List from NPS, January 2017
 NPS Publications

 01
Units
Units
Units
Units
Units
Units
Units
Units
Units
Units
Units
01